Connie Temweka Gabisile Chiume (born 5 June 1952) is a South African actress and filmmaker. She is known for her film roles in Black Panther, Black Is King and Blessers. On television, she appeared in Zone 14, Rhythm City, and Gomora.

Early life
Chiume was born in Welkom, South Africa. Her father Wright Tadeyo Chiume (d. 1983) was from Usisya, Nkhata Bay, Malawi and her mother MaNdlovu (d. 2020) hailed from KwaZulu-Natal, South Africa. Her cousin, Ephraim Mganda Chiume is a Malawian politician.

Chiume spent her early childhood in Welkom. She completed her matric in the Eastern Cape and went on to graduate with a degree in teaching in 1976. After few years of teaching, she quit to travel and moved to Greece.

Career
Chiume began her acting career with roles in Porgy and Bess, Ipi Ntombi, and Little Shop of Horrors. Upon returning to South Africa, she was cast as Thembi in the 1989 series Inkom' Edla Yodwa and then the 1990 film Warriors from Hell. In 2000, she won the award for Best Actress in a Drama Series at the South African Film and Television Awards.

In 2006, she starred in the stage productions of You Strike The Woman and You Strike The Rock.  From 2007 to 2015, Chiume gained prominence through her role as Stella Moloi in the SABC1 drama series Zone 14, which earned her another SAFTA. She also received the Award for the Best Supporting Actress in a Drama during the 3rd SAFTA. In 2015, she appeared in the soap opera Rhythm City as Mamokete Khuse.

In 2018, Chiume played the Mining Tribe Elder in the Marvel Cinematic Universe film Black Panther.

In 2020, Chiume landed the role of Mam'Sonto Molefe in the drama series Gomora and appeared in the film Black Is King. In October 2020, she received a Feather Award nomination.

Personal life
Chiume was married from 1985 to 2004. She is a mother of four, with two sons and two daughters.

Filmography

Film

Television

References

External links
 
 Filmmakers, actors seek solutions to grow industry
 Ashukile Mwakisulu engages Connie Chiume on film industry

Living people
1952 births
South African people of Malawian descent
South African film actresses
South African television actresses